Littlefork is a city in Koochiching County, Minnesota, United States. The population was 553 at the 2020 census.

U.S. Highway 71 and state highways 65 and 217 are three of the main routes in Littlefork.

History
A post office called Littlefork has been in operation since 1902. The city was named for the nearby Little Fork River.

Geography

Demographics

2010 census
As of the census of 2010, there were 647 people, 258 households, and 154 families living in the city. The racial makeup of the city was 99.1% White, 0.2% African American, 0.3% Native American, 0.2% from other races, and 0.3% from two or more races. Hispanic or Latino of any race were 0.6% of the population.

There were 258 households, of which 24.0% had children under the age of 18 living with them, 49.2% were married couples living together, 7.4% had a female householder with no husband present, 3.1% had a male householder with no wife present, and 40.3% were non-families. 33.3% of all households were made up of individuals, and 19.4% had someone living alone who was 65 years of age or older. The average household size was 2.33 and the average family size was 3.04.

The median age in the city was 47.3 years. 23% of residents were under the age of 18; 5.7% were between the ages of 18 and 24; 18.6% were from 25 to 44; 28.8% were from 45 to 64; and 23.8% were 65 years of age or older. The gender makeup of the city was 45.7% male and 54.3% female.

2000 census
As of the census of 2000, there were 680 people, 268 households, and 177 families living in the city. The racial makeup of the city was 99.41% white, and 0.59% from two or more races. Hispanic or Latino of any race were 0.74% of the population.

There were 268 households, out of which 31.3% had children under the age of 18 living with them, 54.9% were married couples living together, 7.5% had a female householder with no husband present, and 33.6% were non-families. 30.6% of all households were made up of individuals, and 17.9% had someone living alone who was 65 years of age or older. The average household size was 2.37 and the average family size was 2.97.

In the city, the population was spread out, with 25.0% under the age of 18, 5.3% from 18 to 24, 23.1% from 25 to 44, 23.5% from 45 to 64, and 23.1% who were 65 years of age or older. The median age was 43 years. For every 100 females, there were 89.4 males. For every 100 females age 18 and over, there were 88.9 males.

The median income for a household in the city was $37,917, and the median income for a family was $51,417. Males had a median income of $40,000 versus $25,313 for females. The per capita income for the city was $18,532. About 4.8% of families and 8.7% of the population were below the poverty line, including 9.8% of those under age 18 and 14.7% of those age 65 or over.

Notable person
Tim Babcock, Governor of Montana, was born in Littlefork.

References

External links
 City of Littlefork, MN – Official Website

Cities in Minnesota
Cities in Koochiching County, Minnesota